37–38 The Shambles is an historic pair of buildings in the English city of York, North Yorkshire. Grade II* listed buildings, parts of the structures date to the late 15th century, with extensions added in the 17th century. They were both renovated around 1954, including some rebuilding work.

As of 2023, number 37 is occupied by Lunchbox and number 38 by Little Saffrons.

References 

37
Houses in North Yorkshire
Buildings and structures in North Yorkshire
15th-century establishments in England
Grade II* listed buildings in York
Grade II* listed houses
15th century in York